The J.P. Morgan Corporate Challenge is an annual series of 3.5-mile (5.63 km) road footraces owned and operated by JPMorgan Chase, with an intended focus on promoting fitness, camaraderie and team work to employees of local businesses and organizations. Teams are organized by company or organization, and the JPMorgan Chase Foundation celebrates the participants by making a donation to local charities.

History
The Corporate Challenge was founded in 1977 by Manufacturers Hanover with a single race in New York City, with 200 runners from 50 companies. It has since grown to include 13 races in seven countries on five continents, with total participation in 2017 of 248,937 entrants from 7,334 companies.

The events are all-inclusive of skill levels and age, with nearly equal numbers of racers, joggers and walkers. Throughout the 2017 Series, participation was approximately 53-percent male, 47-percent female.  Seven of the 13 Corporate Challenge races in 2017 achieved a full capacity of entrants and most had a pre- and post-race hospitality component, where companies could gather to celebrate their participation.

The J.P. Morgan Corporate Challenge Series will be marking its 42nd consecutive year of operation in 2018. Through all 42 years, the Corporate Challenge has been owned and operated by J.P. Morgan and its predecessor firms.  Manufacturer Hanover was the title owner of the Corporate Challenge from 1977-91.  The event was called the Chemical Bank Corporate Challenge from 1992-95, the Chase Corporate Challenge 1996-2000, the JPMorgan Chase Corporate Challenge 2001-10, and by its current name, the J.P. Morgan Corporate Challenge, since 2011.

The unifying event of the Series is the J.P. Morgan Corporate Challenge Championship, which features the first-place men's, women's and mixed teams from each of the 13 Series cities.  The Championship was first held in 1983, and the 34th Championship was conducted on 13 June 2017 in Frankfurt, Germany. Aaron Bienenfeld of Frankfurter Laufshop (Frankfurt) and Trisha Byler of DuPont (Rochester) earned the men's and women's individual titles.  Airbnb, Google (San Francisco) and Morgan Stanley (New York)captured the mixed, men's and women's team titles, respectively.

Results

References

 http://www.sportingspectrum.com/index.php?type=9&id=38
 http://www.buffalonews.com/145/story/85014.html
 https://web.archive.org/web/20070928165519/http://rochesterdandc.com/apps/pbcs.dll/article?AID=%2F20070328%2FLIVING%2F703280338%2F1007

External links
 Official web site

JPMorgan Chase
Long-distance running competitions
Sports competitions in Boston
Sports competitions in New York City
Sports competitions in Chicago
Sports competitions in San Francisco
Sports competitions in Frankfurt
Sports competitions in London
Sports competitions in Sydney
Sports competitions in Singapore
Sports competitions in Shanghai
Sports competitions in Johannesburg
Road running competitions
Recurring sporting events established in 1977